Kandia Kaïn Émile Traoré (born 5 July 1980) is an Ivorian former professional footballer who played as a forward.

Club career
Born in Abidjan, Traoré started his career at Tunisian club Espérance Tunis, before moving to Le Havre in 2005. In January 2008, he signed a three and a half deal with FC Sochaux-Montbéliard. On 17 July 2009, he signed with Stade Malherbe Caen on loan for a season.

International career
Following an impressive start to the 2006–07 Ligue 2 season, he was called up to the national squad for the friendly against Sweden on 15 November 2006, making his debut as a substitute. In March 2007, he was one of four players to receive a late call-up for the Ivorian's African Cup of Nations qualifier against Madagascar in Antananarivo, due to injuries to other members of the squad. He was also the member of the team at 2002 African Cup of Nations.

References

External links
 
 

1980 births
Living people
Footballers from Abidjan
Association football forwards
Ivorian footballers
Ivory Coast international footballers
2002 African Cup of Nations players
Stade d'Abidjan players
Al Ain FC players
Espérance Sportive de Tunis players
Étoile Sportive du Sahel players
Le Havre AC players
Al Hilal SFC players
Al-Nasr SC (Dubai) players
FC Sochaux-Montbéliard players
RC Strasbourg Alsace players
Stade Malherbe Caen players
Budapest Honvéd FC players
Ligue 1 players
Ligue 2 players
Nemzeti Bajnokság I players
Ivorian expatriate footballers
Expatriate footballers in France
Expatriate footballers in Tunisia
Expatriate footballers in Sudan
Expatriate footballers in the United Arab Emirates
Expatriate footballers in Hungary
Ivorian expatriate sportspeople in Tunisia
Ivorian expatriate sportspeople in France
Ivorian expatriate sportspeople in Hungary
Tunisian Ligue Professionnelle 1 players
UAE Pro League players
Saudi Professional League players